Dimitar Dimitrov Agura (26 October 1849 – 11 October 1911) was a Bulgarian historian, one of the first professors of history at Sofia University and a rector of the university.

Agura was born to a Bessarabian Bulgarian family in Chushmelia, Bessarabia, then part of the Romania (today Krynychne, Odesa Oblast, Ukraine). He started his education in Bolgrad and finished the seminary in Iaşi, Romania, in 1868. Agura graduated in history from the University of Iaşi in 1872. He proceeded to work as a teacher in Bârlad (1872–1874) and a school inspector in Iaşi and Vaslui. For several years, he taught Romanian language and Bulgarian history at the Bolhrad High School (1875–1878).

With the Liberation of Bulgaria in 1878, Dimitar Agura arrived in the newly established Principality of Bulgaria and worked as a clerk at the Ministry of Interior (1879–1883). He was an interim Minister of Popular Enlightenment in Leonid Sobolev's cabinet (1883). After that, he was director of the Sofia (1884–1885) and Plovdiv (1885–1889) men's high schools.

The Sofia University was founded in 1888 and Agura became a lecturer of history at the university in 1889. He was rector of Sofia University three times (1889–1890, 1892–1895, 1907–1908). He was the university's second rector, after fellow Bessarabian Bulgarian Aleksandar Teodorov-Balan. In 1900, Agura became an acting member of the Bulgarian Academy of Sciences. In 1901, he was among the founders of the Bulgarian Historical Society; he remained its chairman until his death.

Dimitar Agura died in 1911 in Iaşi, where he was attending the University of Iaşi's 50th anniversary celebrations.

Bibliography
 Modern history from the French Revolution until today (1890)
 Notes on a scholarly journey to Romania (1893; co-authorship)
 The Daco-Romanians and their Slavic writing (1893; co-authorship)
 Mediaeval history. Lectures (1904)

References
 

1849 births
1911 deaths
19th-century Bulgarian historians
Bessarabian Bulgarians
People from Odesa Oblast
Academic staff of Sofia University
Rectors of Sofia University
Members of the Bulgarian Academy of Sciences
20th-century Bulgarian historians